The 2010–11 Karnataka State Film Awards, presented by Government of Karnataka, to felicitate the best of Kannada Cinema released in the year 2010. The selection committee was headed by retired filmmaker S. K. Bhagavan.

Lifetime achievement award

Jury 

A committee headed by S. K. Bhagavan was appointed to evaluate the feature films awards.

Film Awards

Other Awards

References

Karnataka State Film Awards
2011 in Indian cinema